Ravne na Blokah is a village southeast of Nova Vas in the Municipality of Bloke in the Inner Carniola region of Slovenia.

Name
The name of the settlement was changed from Ravne to Ravne na Blokah in 1953.

Church
The local church in the settlement is dedicated to Saint Philip and Saint James and belongs to the Parish of Bloke.

References

External links
Ravne na Blokah on Geopedia

Populated places in the Municipality of Bloke